Johan Salomon (born 7 May 1997) is a Norwegian chess grandmaster. He was Norwegian Chess Champion in 2016.

Chess career
 
He achieved the title International Master in 2015, and was awarded the title of grandmaster in 2017.
 
Salomon achieved his first Grandmaster norm in the 2015 Sitges tournament, with subsequent norms in the Manhem Chess Week in Gothenburg in 2016, and in the 19th Dubai Open Chess Tournament in 2017. He was designated IM in 2015, and GM in 2017.

Salomon won the Norwegian Chess Championship  in 2016.

References

Norwegian chess players
1997 births
Living people
Chess grandmasters